Frédéric Finot (born 20 March 1977 in Nevers) is a French former road cyclist. He was professional 1999 to 2008.

Career achievements

Major results

1993
 1st  Time trial, National Novice Road Championships
1995
 3rd Time trial, National Junior Road Championships
1996
 2nd Road race, National Under-23 Road Championships
1998
 1st Stage 3 Le Triptyque des Monts et Châteaux
 UCI Under-23 World Road Championships
2nd  Time trial
9th Road race
1999
 3rd Time trial, National Road Championships
2000
 1st Prologue Tour de Normandie (TTT)
 1st Stage 5 Tour de Wallonie
 1st Stage 5 Tour de l'Avenir
 3rd Duo Normand (with Anthony Langella)
 4th Chrono des Herbiers
 6th Grand Prix de Wallonie
 7th Grand Prix des Nations
 7th Tro-Bro Léon
2001
 8th Grand Prix de Denain
2002
 1st Tour du Doubs
 2nd Grand Prix de Denain
2003
 1st Stage 1 Four Days of Dunkirk
 6th Tro-Bro Léon
2004
 1st Boucles de l'Aulne
 1st Duo Normand (with Eddy Seigneur)
 3rd Time trial, National Road Championships
 10th Grand Prix des Nations
 10th Paris–Camembert
2005
 1st  Overall Paris–Corrèze
1st Stage 3
 3rd Time trial, National Road Championships
 6th Cholet-Pays de Loire
2006
 3rd Tour du Doubs
 7th Overall Circuit Franco-Belge
 8th Tour du Finistère
2007
 1st Stage 4 Route du Sud
 4th Grand Prix de la Somme
2008
 3rd Classic Loire Atlantique
 9th Overall Boucle de l'Artois
2010
 1st Stage 5 Tour Alsace

Grand Tour general classification results timeline

References

1977 births
Living people
French male cyclists
People from Nevers
Sportspeople from Nièvre
Cyclists from Bourgogne-Franche-Comté
20th-century French people
21st-century French people